Antonio Diedo (15 November 1772 – 1 January 1847) was an Italian architect. Born in Venice, he was active both in his natal city and the mainland towns of the Republic of Venice.

Biography
Born to parents from the Venetian patrician families of Diedo and Priuli, as a young man he entered the seminary in Padua. He soon developed an interest in architecture and was educated in that art by Giacomo or Jacopo Albertolli (nephew of Giocondo Albertolli), a noted architect. Antonio wrote a number of treatises on architecture, including a monograph on Giovanni Battista Novello; a Speech on Architecture read in 1805 at the Accademia Veneta dei Filareti; also a Dissertation about the imitation of the antique in architecture given to the same academy; and article in the Giornale di Padova about the work of Jacopo Querenghi, titled Sul bello di proporzione in architettura. He became secretary and professor of the Academy of Fine Arts of Venice. In 1838, he was knighted to the Order of the Iron Crown by the Austrian emperor Ferdinand I.

Among his designs were:
Rear facade of Palazzo Giustinian-Recanati sulle Zattere, Venice
Windows and door of the facade of San Maurizio, Venice
Oratory in Casa Grimani-Wetzlar on the Brenta Canal
Principal stairwell of Casa Contarini in the frazione of Ponte di Brenta, Padua
Ground floor of Palazzo Giovanelli in Ponte di Brenta
Facade of Casa Gregoletto at Via Altinate #124
Parish church and bell-tower at Canda in the Province of Rovigo
Facade of the Duomo of Schio, while the entrance stairs were designed by Giovanni Battista Meduna
Main altar of the parish church of San Bonifacio
Parish church and bell-tower at Piovene Rocchette
Bell-tower at Breganze
Altars for the church of San Pietro, Belluno
Bell-tower of San Vito, Asolo
Oratory in Casa Trevisan in Mogliano Veneto
Church of San Donato di Piave

References 

1772 births
1847 deaths
19th-century Italian architects
Italian art historians
Architects from Venice